Bocourtia is a genus of tropical air-breathing land snails, a pulmonate gastropod mollusks in the subfamily Bulimulinae of the family Bulimulidae.

Species 
Species within the genus Bocourtia include:

 Bocourtia aequatorius (L. Pfeiffer, 1853)
 Bocourtia alauda (Hupé, 1857)
 Bocourtia altorum (Haas, 1951)
 Bocourtia angrandi (Morelet, 1860)
 Bocourtia anthisanensis (L. Pfeiffer, 1854)
 Bocourtia aquila (Reeve, 1848)
 Bocourtia aurea (Breure, 1978)
 Bocourtia badia (G. B. Sowerby I, 1835)
 Bocourtia bicolor (G. B. Sowerby I, 1835)
 † Bocourtia bonariensis Miquel, 2019 
 Bocourtia caliginosa (Reeve, 1849)
 Bocourtia coagulata (Reeve, 1849)
 Bocourtia confusa (Reeve, 1848)
 Bocourtia costifer (Pilsbry, 1932)
 Bocourtia costulata (Weyrauch, 1967)
 Bocourtia cotopaxiensis (L. Pfeiffer, 1853)
 Bocourtia culminea (d'Orbigny, 1835)
 Bocourtia cuzcoensis (Weyrauch, 1967)
 Bocourtia edwardsi (Morelet, 1863)
 Bocourtia filaris (L. Pfeiffer, 1854)
 Bocourtia gayi (L. Pfeiffer, 1857)
 Bocourtia hendeensis (Pilsbry, 1926)
 Bocourtia lithoica (d'Orbigny, 1835)
 Bocourtia longitudinalis (Haas, 1955)
 Bocourtia macedoi (Weyrauch, 1967)
 Bocourtia minuta (Breure, 1978)
 Bocourtia nemorensis (Philippi, 1867)
 Bocourtia ochracea (Morelet, 1863)
 Bocourtia peakei (Breure, 1978)
 Bocourtia petiti (L. Pfeiffer, 1846)
 Bocourtia pluto (Crosse, 1869)
 Bocourtia polymorpha (d'Orbigny, 1835)
 Bocourtia promethus (Crosse, 1869)
 Bocourtia purpurata (Reeve, 1849)
 Bocourtia pyramidalis (Breure, 1978)
 Bocourtia revinctus (Hupé, 1857)
 Bocourtia thamnoica (d'Orbigny, 1835)
 Bocourtia tupacii (d'Orbigny, 1835)
 Bocourtia weddellii (Hupé, 1857)

Species brought into synonymy
 Bocourtia lymnaeformis Rochebrune, 1881: synonym of Bocourtia anthisanensis (L. Pfeiffer, 1854)

References

 Breure, A. S. H. (1978). Notes on and descriptions of Bulimulidae (Mollusca, Gastropoda). Zoologische Verhandelingen, Leiden. 164: 3-255
 Hylton Scott M.I. (1951). Kuschelenia, nuevo género de Bulimulidae (Moll. Pulmonata). Acta Zoologica Lilloana. 12: 539–543.
 Bank, R. A. (2017). Classification of the Recent terrestrial Gastropoda of the World. Last update: July 16, 2017

External links 
 Rochebrune, A.-T., 1881 Bulletin de la Société Philomathique de Paris, 6(7): Paris

Bulimulidae